V-League 2005 was the 49th season of Vietnam's professional football league. Tan Hiep Phat was the league's sponsor, replacing Kinh Do.

Đồng Tâm Long An F.C. won their first title in this season, displacing two-time champions Hoàng Anh Gia Lai.

External links
Vietnam Football Federation

Vietnamese Super League seasons
Vietnam
Vietnam
1